Nemesis is an American pop music duo consisting of the mirror identical twin brothers Jacob and Joshua Miller. The pair can be differentiated by their hair colors; Jacob is blond, while Joshua's hair is brown. Joshua is also a few minutes older than Jacob.

The journey of the duo was portrayed on the Logo television network reality series entitled Jacob and Joshua: Nemesis Rising. The show premiered on October 16, 2006.

Nemesis were signed with Curb Records in 2001. The duo released the EP Let Me Help You Out in 2005. "Number One in Heaven", the first single from the album Rise Up, was released in September 2006 and was quickly followed by "Rise Up" in October to coincide with the premiere of the reality show. The music video for "Number One in Heaven" could be seen on the Click List Music program of Logo. It also aired on MTV Hits, which, like Logo, is owned by MTV Networks.

Personal life
They were raised as Jehovah's Witnesses in Kalispell, Montana but have since left the religion. They were disfellowshipped after publicly stating they had left the religion.

Discography
 Let Me Help You Out (EP) - 2005
 Rise Up - 2006

References

External links

Musical groups established in 2001
American pop music groups
LGBT-themed musical groups
Participants in American reality television series
Sibling musical duos
Musical groups from Montana
American musical duos